Andrea Masetti (born 20 March 1998) is an Italian footballer who plays as a defender for A.C.D. Nardò.

Club career

Sassuolo 
Born in Guastalla, Masetti was a youth exponent of Sassuolo.

Loan to Fano 
On 17 July 2017, Masetti was signed by Serie C side Alma Juventus Fano on a season-long loan deal. On 1 October he made his Serie C debut for the club as a substitute replacing Gianmarco Fabbri in the 17th minute of a 1–0 home defeat against Ravenna. Three days later, on 4 October, Masetti played his first entire match for Alma Juventus Fano, a 2–1 away defeat against Vicenza. Masetti ended his season-long loan with only 10 appearances, including 8 as a starter, but all in the first part of the season and he remained an unused substitute for 19 times during the rest of the season.

Loan to Pontedera 
On 11 July 2018, Masetti was loaned to Serie C club Pontedera on a season-long loan deal. On 29 July he made his debut for Pontedera in a match lost 4–2 at penalties after a 1–1 away draw against Ternana in the first round of Coppa Italia, he was replaced by Alessio Benedetti in the 70th minute. On 22 September he made his Serie C debut for Pontedera as a substitute replacing Andrea Magrini in the 93rd minute of a 2–0 away defeat against Piacenza. On 21 October, Masetti played his first match as a starter for Pontedera in Serie C, a 0–0 away draw against Pro Vercelli, he was replaced after 66 minute for Nicolas La Vigna. On 9 December he played his first entire match for Pontedera, a 2–1 home win over Pro Piacenza. Masetti ended his loan to Pontedera with 24 appearances.

Arezzo 
On 22 July 2019, Masetti joined to Serie C side Arezzo on an undisclosed fee and a 2-year contract. On 11 August he made his debut or the club in a 4–3 away defeat against Crotone in the second round of Coppa Italia, he played the entire match. On 6 October 2020 his contract was terminated by mutual consent.

Loan to Pro Patria
On 2 September 2019, he joined Pro Patria on loan with a purchase option. Six days later, on 8 September, he made his debut for the club as a substitute replacing Leonardo Galli in the 62nd minute of a 1–1 home draw against Pergolettese. On 25 September he played his first entire match for Pro Patria, a 2–0 home win over Pianese. On 15 December he scored his first professional goal in the 65th minute of a 3–0 away win over Giana Erminio. Masetti ended his season-long loan to Pro Partia with 22 appearances, including 14 as a starter, and 1 goal.

Return to Pro Patria
On 3 March 2021, he returned to Pro Patria until the end of the 2020–21 season.

AC Nardò
On 11 September 2021, he joined Serie D club Nardò.

Career statistics

Club

Honours

Club 
Sassuolo Primavera
 Torneo di Viareggio: 2017

References

External links
 
 

1998 births
Living people
People from Guastalla
Footballers from Emilia-Romagna
Italian footballers
Association football defenders
Serie C players
Serie D players
U.S. Sassuolo Calcio players
Alma Juventus Fano 1906 players
U.S. Città di Pontedera players
S.S. Arezzo players
Aurora Pro Patria 1919 players
Sportspeople from the Province of Reggio Emilia